Dolton (pronounced "DAWL-ton") is a village in Cook County, Illinois, United States. The population was 21,426 at the 2020 census. Dolton is located just west of the expressway Interstate 94 and immediately south of the city limits of Chicago. Its most common ZIP code is 60419.

Dolton is bordered by Chicago to the north, Riverdale and Harvey to the west, South Holland to the south and Calumet City to the east.

History
A post office has been in operation in Dolton since 1854. The village was named for a family of early settlers.

Geography
Dolton is located at  (41.627509, -87.598512).

Surrounding areas
 Chicago 
 Riverdale    Chicago 
 Riverdale / Harvey   Calumet City
 Harvey    South Holland
 South Holland

Demographics

As of the 2020 census there were 21,426 people, 7,985 households, and 5,361 families residing in the village. The racial makeup of the village was 90.69% African American, 3.25% White, 0.17% Native American, 0.21% Asian, 0.01% Pacific Islander, 2.62% from other races, and 3.04% from two or more races. Hispanic or Latino of any race were 4.37% of the population.

There were 7,985 households, out of which 54.29% had children under the age of 18 living with them, 25.45% were married couples living together, 35.94% had a female householder with no husband present, and 32.86% were non-families. 29.42% of all households were made up of individuals, and 12.10% had someone living alone who was 65 years of age or older. The average household size was 3.44 and the average family size was 2.78.

The village's age distribution consisted of 24.8% under the age of 18, 10.7% from 18 to 24, 21.8% from 25 to 44, 27% from 45 to 64, and 15.7% who were 65 years of age or older. The median age was 36.7 years. For every 100 females, there were 86.3 males. For every 100 females age 18 and over, there were 79.5 males.

The median income for a household in the village was $50,237, and the median income for a family was $57,634. Males had a median income of $33,939 versus $33,354 for females. The per capita income for the village was $22,135. About 15.4% of families and 22.1% of the population were below the poverty line, including 42.8% of those under age 18 and 13.2% of those age 65 or over.

Note: the US Census treats Hispanic/Latino as an ethnic category. This table excludes Latinos from the racial categories and assigns them to a separate category. Hispanics/Latinos can be of any race.

Government
Dolton is in Illinois's 2nd congressional district and the 15th State Senate District. Approximately 3/4 of the village is within the Illinois Legislature's 29th Representative District, with the remainder in the 30th district. The village is split evenly between the Cook County Judicial Circuit 1st Subcircuit and 2nd Subcircuit.

Most of the village is part of the Dolton Park District, with a small portion served by the Calumet Memorial Park District. The entire village is part of the Dolton Public Library District and the Metropolitan Water Reclamation District.

Education
Dolton is served primarily by Dolton School District 148 and Dolton School District 149. A small portion of the village is within South Holland School District 151.  High school students are served by Thornton Township High School District Number 205, which operates Thornridge High School in Dolton.

The entire village is part of South Suburban Community College District 510.

Notable people
Dolton is the hometown of former NFL star Donovan McNabb, At the Movies with Ebert & Roeper co-host Richard Roeper, actress Jane Lynch, news anchor Susan Carlson, and Los Angeles Times editor-in-chief Jim Kirk.
William Shaw, Illinois state legislator, served as the first African-American mayor of Dolton. He was followed as mayor by Ronnie Lewis who was the first African-American to serve as an official in the Dolton government.  Nelsan Ellis, who played Lafayette Reynolds in True Blood, grew up there. R. Bruce Waddell, Illinois state representative and businessman, was born in Dolton.

References

External links
Village of Dolton official website

Villages in Illinois
Chicago metropolitan area
Villages in Cook County, Illinois
Populated places established in 1893
1893 establishments in Illinois
Majority-minority cities and towns in Cook County, Illinois